Tom or Tommy Adams may refer to:
 Tom Adams (actor) (1938–2014), English actor
 Tom Adams (cricketer) (1808–1894), English cricketer
 Thomas Burton Adams Jr. (1917–2006), American politician in Florida, known as Tom
 Tom Adams (illustrator) (1926–2019), American illustrator
 Tom Adams (bluegrass musician) (born 1958), American bluegrass musician
 Tom Adams (politician) (1931–1985), Prime Minister of Barbados, real name Jon Adams
 Tommy Adams (criminal) (born 1958), Clerkenwell crime syndicate
 Tommy Adams (footballer) (1916–1984), Scottish footballer
 Tom Adams (entrepreneur) (born 1972), Swedish-American businessman
 Tom Adams (Canadian football) (born 1934), Canadian football end
 Tommy Adams (basketball) (born 1980), American basketball player
 Tom Adams (American football) (born 1940), American football player

See also
 Thomas Adams (disambiguation)
 Adams (surname)